Cordulegaster dorsalis (Pacific spiketail) is a dragonfly in the family Cordulegastridae.

References

External links

Cordulegastridae
Insects described in 1858
Taxa named by Hermann August Hagen